Connor James Dimaio (born 28 January 1996) is a professional footballer who plays as a midfielder for Curzon Ashton. Born in England, he has represented the Republic of Ireland at under-21 level.

Club career

Sheffield United
A product of United's Academy, Dimaio made his first team début in March 2014 in an away game at Crawley Town. Dimaio made two further appearances for the Blades before the end of the season, which was enough to see him awarded the club's annual 'Young Player of the Year' award.

Chesterfield
Dimaio signed for  League One side Chesterfield on 1 February 2016, on a contract until the end of the season, having been released by Sheffield United on the same day as he signed for Chesterfield. He scored his first goal for Chesterfield in a 3–1 win against Crewe Alexandra on 20 February 2016.

Stockport County
In May 2018, Dimaio signed a two-year deal with Stockport County. In February 2019 he joined Ashton United on loan until the end of the season.

After leaving Stockport, Diamio joined National League North side Boston United in August 2020. On 25 February 2022, he signed for National League side Curzon Ashton, returning to the club until the end of the season.

Curzon Ashton
In July 2022, he signed permanently for National League North side Curzon Ashton.

International career
Having represented Republic of Ireland at under-16 and under-17 level, Dimaio was called up to the Republic of Ireland under-19 side in August 2013. He made his debut in a friendly fixture against Norway later that month. In mid May 2014, Dimaio started in two friendly defeats for Ireland Under-19s, both against Mexico Under-20s.

Dimaio was called up for the under-21 team in March 2016 and made his debut in a European qualifier against Slovenia.

Career statistics

References

External links

1996 births
Living people
Footballers from Chesterfield
English footballers
Republic of Ireland association footballers
Association football midfielders
Sheffield United F.C. players
Chesterfield F.C. players
Stockport County F.C. players
Ashton United F.C. players
Curzon Ashton F.C. players
Boston United F.C. players
English Football League players
National League (English football) players
Republic of Ireland youth international footballers
Republic of Ireland under-21 international footballers
English people of Irish descent